Warpcon is an annual wargaming and roleplaying convention held at University College Cork (UCC) in Cork, Ireland. As of 2010, the organiser's reportedly described it as "Europe's largest student-run gaming convention". Beginning in 1990, it is run annually over a single weekend in January. Run by UCC's Wargaming And RolePlaying Society (WARPS), games played at Warpcon include role-playing games (RPGs) from several systems, collectible card games (CCGs), live action role-playing games (LARPs) and tabletop wargames. The 20th anniversary event, in 2010, reportedly hosted approximately 700 attendees.

History 
First held in 1990/1991, the inaugural event was attended by 40 people in a single-room venue, growing to approximately 650 people by the time of the 2009 convention.

In 2006, the Diana Jones Award for Excellence in Gaming was awarded to "Irish Game Convention Charity Auctions", including Gaelcon and Warpcon.

In past years, Warpcon has invited writers, artists and other special guests to sign merchandise and occasionally run events such as games-making workshops. Previous attendees and special guests have included John Kovalic, Steve Jackson, Gareth Hanrahan, Games Workshop's Jervis Johnson, actor David Nykl, and actor and  puppeteer Ross Mullan.

Events and features
Warpcon stages a charity auction of collectibles and other items; Previous auctions have included signed first-edition and pre-publication books, slots to appear as a character drawn by John Kovalic in card game, rare collectible cards, Jayne Cobb's hat (as worn in the TV show Firefly), and the first ever "My Little Cthulhu" plush toy. The auction takes place on the Saturday night of the convention, with proceeds going to a local charity.
 
In previous years various CCGs, from Magic: The Gathering to Yu-Gi-Oh!, have been hosted at Warpcon. RPGs and LARPs from different systems are also run, with some based on the theme of that year's convention. Wargames played at Warpcon have included Warhammer 40,000, Warmachine, X-wing, and historical wargaming.

References

External links
 

Culture in Cork (city)
Gaming conventions
Annual events in Ireland
1991 establishments in Ireland
Recurring events established in 1991